Sir Thomas Skelton (died 1416), of Hinxton, Cambridgeshire and Sherborne 'Coudray', Hampshire, was an English politician.

He was a Member (MP) of the Parliament of England for Cambridgeshire in January 1397 and for Hampshire in 1399 and 1406.

References

14th-century births
1416 deaths
English MPs January 1397
English MPs 1399
People from South Cambridgeshire District
English MPs 1406